Jonathan Todd Ross (born May 30, 1978) is an American voice actor and writer. He is known for providing voices on properties for 4Kids Entertainment, Central Park Media, Media Blasters, as well as audiobooks. He is also credited as Todd Garbeil. Ross is best known as the voice of Marik Ishtar and Yami Marik in the Yu-Gi-Oh! anime. He also voiced Slade Princeton in Yu-Gi-Oh! GX.

Filmography

Television roles

Film roles

Animation roles
Genshiken - Genshiken President
Kujibiki Unbalance - Mugio Rokuhara
One Piece (4Kids dub edition) - Kohza, Ben Beckman
Pokémon - Tommy, Robin, Watt, Vito
Teenage Mutant Ninja Turtles - Sid Jones
Time Bokan: Royal Revival - Ken the Eagle, Narrator
Winx Club (4Kids Entertainment edit) - Additional voices
Yu-Gi-Oh! - Marik Ishtar, Yami Marik, Strings, Additional voices
Yu-Gi-Oh! GX - Slade Princeton
Yu-Gi-Oh! 5D's - Unnamed Yliaster member
Shaman King (2021 series) - Kalim

Video games
Yu-Gi-Oh! Capsule Monster Coliseum - Yami Marik, Marik Ishtar
Yu-Gi-Oh! Duel Links - Yami Marik

Audiobooks
 An Elegant Solution
 Animal Grossology
 Dirty Laundry
 Eating Animals
 Fake Mustache
 Fat Chance: Beating the Odds Against Sugar, Processed Food, Obesity, and Disease
 Finite and Infinite Games
 The Four
 Framed
 George Brown, Class Clown
 Goldberg Variations by Susan Isaacs
 Hero Type
 Hold Me Closer Necromancer
 Ignition! An Informal History of Liquid Rocket Propellants
 Kiss: I Wanna Rock and Roll All Night
 Leap
 Little Failure - A Memoir
 Lockstep
 Middle Men: Stories
 My Father's Business
 Necromancing the Stone
 Restart 
 Rooftops of Tehran 
 Swindle
 The TB12 Method: How to Achieve a Lifetime of Sustained Peak Performance
 The Son Also Rises: Surnames and the History of Social Mobility
 The Strange Case of Origami Yoda 
 The Year of Living Biblically 
 Ungifted
 Young Zeus
 Zoobreak

References

External links
Official Website
End Credits Movie Blog

Living people
1978 births
21st-century American male actors
Place of birth missing (living people)
American male film actors
American male stage actors
American male television actors
American male video game actors
American male voice actors
Tisch School of the Arts alumni